LICR may refer to:

 Ludwig Institute for Cancer Research
 Reggio Calabria Airport